This is a list of notable Jewish American architects. For other Jewish Americans, see Lists of Jewish Americans.

A 
 Max Abramovitz
 Dankmar Adler (German-born)
 David Adler
 Gregory Ain
 Michael Arad (Israeli-British-American)

B 
 Edward Blum and George Blum, École des Beaux-Arts-trained brothers of Alsatian-French descent; celebrated for their terra cotta embellished, Art Nouveau Manhattan apartment buildings; ended their career with two Art Deco works; their work was catalogued in Andrew S. Dolkart and Susan Tunick's 1993 book  George & Edward Blum: Texture and Design in New York Apartment House Architecture
 Marcel Breuer (Hungarian-born)
Arnold Brunner, considered the first successful American born Jewish architect in the US; also a city planner; namesake of an annual award by the American Academy of Arts and Letters and a grant by the American Institute of Architects' New York chapter
 Gordon Bunshaft

C 

 Irwin Chanin
 Elizabeth Close
 Preston Scott Cohen

D 

 Elizabeth Diller (Polish-born)
 Dan Dworsky

E 
 Cyrus L. W. Eidlitz
 Peter Eisenman

F 

 Ulrich Franzen (German-born)
 James Ingo Freed (German-born)

G 
 Frank Gehry
 Bertrand Goldberg
 Myron Goldsmith
 Percival Goodman

K 
 Albert Kahn (Prussian-born)
 Louis Kahn (Estonian-born)

L 
Edgar M. Lazarus (1868–1939), prominent in the Portland, Oregon area for more than 45 years, best known as the architect of the Vista House
 Daniel Libeskind (Polish-born)

M 
 Richard Meier

N 

 Richard Neutra (Austrian-born)

R 
Alfred Rosenheim

S 
 Rudolph Schindler

U 
Joseph Urban, architect, set designer and book illustrator

References

 Jewish American
 American
Architects, Jewish American
Architects
 Architects
American architects by ethnic or national origin
Jewish American